Events in the year 1970 in Cyprus.

Incumbents 

 President: Makarios III
 President of the Parliament: Glafcos Clerides

Events 

 5 July – Eniaion won 15 of the 35 seats in parliament following parliamentary elections. However, AKEL receiving a far larger share of the vote.

Deaths

References 

 
1970s in Cyprus
Years of the 21st century in Cyprus
Cyprus
Cyprus
Cyprus